Usaia Naiteitei Sotutu (born 20 September 1947 in Tavea, Bua, Fiji) is a former runner who represented Fiji at the 1972 Summer Olympics.

Personal life 
Usaia was born to Tevita Naiteitei and Akisi Buasega in 1947 in Fiji. He represented Fiji in several international track and field competitions, including the South Pacific Games and the Summer Olympics. Shortly after participating in the Olympics, he attended Brigham Young University in Provo, Utah, on a full scholarship for track and cross-country. While attending BYU, he converted to the Church of Jesus Christ of Latter-day Saints. In 1973, he took a break from his college and track career to serve a two-year mission for the Church back in Fiji.  He later married Catherine Marie Olson in 1975, who was also studying at BYU. After finishing his schooling in Provo, he, Cathie, and their first son, David, moved back to Fiji.  They lived there for three years. During that time he taught physical education, and they had two more children, Juliette and Charles.  Then they moved to Kent, Washington in 1980. There he went to work for Boeing, and they had two more daughters, Jennifer and Diana. He and Cathie were divorced in 2004, but he still lives in the Seattle, Washington area and still works for Boeing.

Running/athletics career 
Usaia was a noted runner in Fiji and was selected to represent Fiji in the South Pacific Games (now Pacific Games) numerous times.  In 1972, he was chosen to represent Fiji in the Summer Olympics.  He did not win any medals.

Achievements

After Retirement 
It is not known when he retired, but he was ushered into the Fiji Sports Hall of Fame in 1993.

Internal References 
 Fiji at the 1972 Summer Olympics

References

External links

Fiji Association of Sports and National Olympic Committee#Fiji Sports Hall of Fame

1947 births
Living people
Fijian male steeplechase runners
Olympic athletes of Fiji
Athletes (track and field) at the 1972 Summer Olympics
BYU Cougars men's track and field athletes
Converts to Mormonism
Fijian Latter Day Saints
Fijian Mormon missionaries
Mormon missionaries in Fiji
20th-century Mormon missionaries
Sportspeople from Kent, Washington
Track and field athletes from Seattle
People from Bua Province
Fijian male long-distance runners
BYU Cougars men's cross country runners